Gimnasio USBI is an indoor arena that is located in Xalapa, Veracruz, Mexico. It is the home arena of the LNBP professional basketball team Halcones UV Xalapa. It was created when the city of Xalapa was granted an expansion team, and the Universidad Veracruzana offered its recently  planned arena to the team for its use.

It hosted 2021 FIBA Under-16 Americas Championship held 23–29 August 2021.

References

Basketball venues in Mexico
Volleyball venues in Mexico
Indoor arenas in Mexico
2003 establishments in Mexico
Sports venues completed in 2003